Joao Robin Rojas Mendoza (born 14 June 1989) is an Ecuadorian professional footballer who plays as a right winger for Deportivo Garcilaso. He also holds Mexican citizenship.

Club career

Ecuadorian clubs
At a young age, he had already played more than 80 games as a professional. He began in Municipal de Cañar as a juvenile for twelve months. The following year, he moved on to Deportivo Quevedo, but was then transferred to Barcelona for a while. In 2007, he moved to Tecnico Universitario where he began his real career. In the 2008 season, he won the award of best juvenile player of the tournament with Tecnico. However, since Tecnico did not qualify for the liguilla final, the club loaned him to River Plate in the Ecuadorian Second Division until January. He has currently been linked with a move to Emelec in the offseason. LDU Quito, El Nacional, and Barcelona have been interested in him as well but they have been put down because of his $1 million price tag. On February 10, 2009, Rojas signed a contract with Emelec.

Monarcas Morelia

2011 season
Emelec loaned Rojas to Morelia in January 2011, in his first season Rojas scored five goals in 22 games, two of which goals were on the semi-final match against Club America, and also scored on the final against UNAM at home, drawing 1–1 in the first leg. but failed to win the championship, and settled for second.

2011–12 season
Monarcas secured his pass to the Michoacán club and received the number 10 shirt for the club. Rojas played 20 games and scored 2 goals. The second half of the season, also called the Clausura, Rojas helped the club to reach the semi-final stages of both the Mexican league and CONCACAF Champions League as well.

2012–13 season
Before the start of the Apertura 2012 season Morelia signed Jefferson Montero, Rojas' former Ecuador U-20 teammate, Rojas and Montero continuously assisted each other in both League and Copa MX matches. His first league goal of the season came in a 3–0 win against Puebla. Later he would score against Club León both league and cup matches, both within a week. He would go on to score two more goals against Querétaro and Atlas.

Cruz Azul

2013–14 season
On the Liga MX draft day, Joao Rojas was transferred to Cruz Azul, and was given the number 11 shirt. His club debut came on July 20, winning 1-0 against Monterrey. On July 26, Joao scored his first goal for Cruz Azul, losing 3-2 against Santos Laguna.

São Paulo
On 22 June 2018, Rojas joined Brazilian club São Paulo FC on a two-year contract.

Return to Ecuador
On 23 March 2022, Rojas returned to Ecuador and signed with Orense.

International career
He was called up to perform at the international level, getting his first cap against Mexico in November 2008. He came on as a substitute in the final minutes of the game. Rojas earned his first senior start the next year in March 2009, in a friendly played against El Salvador.

Rojas have been compared by "El Universo" to Christian Benítez because of his speed, skills, and size. He performed in the U-20 team in Venezuela for the 2009 South American Youth Championship. He scored the two goals in Ecuador's 2-1 win against Peru in the youth championship. Rojas has now been called up for the upcoming South American World Cup Qualifiers and is in contention for a starting line up alongside Carlos Tenorio due to a shoulder injury. Rojas was picked in the 2014 World Cup by Reinaldo Rueda. He came on in the 77' in Ecuador first match against Switzerland.

International goals

Career statistics

National team

Honours
Cruz Azul
CONCACAF Champions League (1): 2013–14

São Paulo
Campeonato Paulista: 2021

References

External links

Rojas' FEF player card 

1989 births
Living people
People from La Troncal
Ecuadorian people of Spanish descent
Naturalized citizens of Mexico
Association football wingers
Ecuadorian footballers
Ecuador international footballers
C.S.D. Independiente del Valle footballers
C.D. Técnico Universitario footballers
C.S. Emelec footballers
Atlético Morelia players
Cruz Azul footballers
Talleres de Córdoba footballers
São Paulo FC players
Orense S.C. players
Ecuadorian Serie A players
Liga MX players
Campeonato Brasileiro Série A players
Argentine Primera División players
2014 FIFA World Cup players
Ecuadorian expatriate footballers
Expatriate footballers in Mexico
Expatriate footballers in Argentina
Expatriate footballers in Brazil
Deportivo Garcilaso players